Neomariania is a genus of moths in the family Stathmopodidae described by Mario Mariani in 1943, although it is sometimes included in the family Cosmopterigidae.

Species
Neomariania incertella (Rebel 1940)
Neomariania oecophorella (Rebel 1940)
Neomariania partinicensis (Rebel 1937)
Neomariania rebeli (Rebel, 1937)
Neomariania scriptella (Rebel, 1940)

References

Fauna Europaea

Stathmopodidae
Moth genera